John Orenge (by 1480 – 1538 or later), of London, Exeter and Plymouth, Devon and Wimborne Minster, Dorset, was an English politician.

Family
His father was also an MP named John Orenge.

Career
He was a Member (MP) of the Parliament of England for Exeter in 1504 and 1510, for Plymouth in 1515 and for Wareham in 1529.

References

15th-century births
16th-century deaths
Politicians from London
Members of the Parliament of England (pre-1707) for Exeter
Members of the Parliament of England (pre-1707) for Wareham
Members of the Parliament of England for Plymouth
Politicians from Dorset
English MPs 1504
English MPs 1510
English MPs 1515
English MPs 1529–1536